Cleavage and polyadenylation specificity factor (CPSF) is involved in the cleavage of the 3' signaling region from a newly synthesized pre-messenger RNA (pre-mRNA) molecule in the process of gene transcription. It is the first protein to bind to the signaling region near the cleavage site of the pre-mRNA, to which the poly(A) tail will be added by polynucleotide adenylyltransferase. The upstream signaling region has the canonical nucleotide sequence AAUAAA, which is highly conserved across the vast majority of pre-mRNAs. A second downstream signaling region, located on the portion of the pre-mRNA that is cleaved before polyadenylation, consists of a GU-rich region required for efficient processing.

Structure

CPSF is a protein complex, consisting of four proteins: CPSF-73, CPSF-100, CPSF-30 and CPSF-160.

CPSF-73 is a zinc-dependent hydrolase which cleaves the mRNA precursor just downstream the polyadenylation signal sequence AAUAAA.

CPSF-160 is the largest subunit of CPSF and directly binds to the AAUAAA polyadenylation signal.

CPSF recruits proteins to the 3' region. Identified proteins that are coordinated by CPSF activity include: cleavage stimulatory factor and the two poorly understood cleavage factors. The binding of the polynucleotide adenylyltransferase responsible for actually synthesizing the tail is a necessary prerequisite for cleavage, thus ensuring that cleavage and polyadenylation are tightly coupled processes.

Genes
 CPSF1, CPSF2, CPSF3, CPSF4, CPSF6

References

 Lodish H, Berk A, Matsudaira P, Kaiser CA, Krieger M, Scott MP, Zipursky SL, Darnell J. (2004). Molecular Cell Biology. WH Freeman: New York, NY. 5th ed.

External links
 

Protein complexes
Gene expression